Katiu, or Taungataki, is an atoll of the central Tuamotu Archipelago in French Polynesia. Its lagoon is connected to the ocean.

Katiu has a population of 250 inhabitants. The main occupations are fishing, copra harvesting and pearl farming. The most important village is called Toini; it is located on one of the long islands of the northeastern reef.

History
The first recorded European to arrive to Katiu was Russian oceanic explorer Fabian Gottlieb von Bellingshausen in 1820 on the ships Vostok and Mirni. He named this atoll "Osten-Saken" or "Saken".

Administration
Katiu belongs to the commune of Makemo, which consists of the atolls of Makemo, Haraiki, Marutea Nord, Katiu, Tuanake, Hiti, Tepoto Sud, Raroia, Takume, Taenga and Nihiru.

References

Oceania

External links
Atoll list (in French)

Atolls of the Tuamotus